The 1969 European Running Target Championships was the 2nd edition of the running target competition, European Running Target Championships, organised by the International Shooting Sport Federation.

The competition was also valid as a 1969 World Running Target Championships, in which the rankings of the races played with all world athletes were drawn up taking into account only European athletes.

Results

Men

Medal table

See also
 1969 World Running Target Championships
 European Shooting Confederation
 International Shooting Sport Federation
 List of medalists at the European Shooting Championships
 List of medalists at the European Shotgun Championships

References

External links
 
 European Champion Archive Results at Sport-komplett-de

European Shotgun Championships
European Running Target Championships